Vexillum albotaeniatum is a species of small sea snail, marine gastropod mollusk in the family Costellariidae, the ribbed miters.

Description
The length of the shell attains 14 mm.

Distribution
This marine species occurs off New Caledonia and the Philippines.

References

 Turner H. 2001. Katalog der Familie Costellariidae Macdonald, 1860. Conchbooks. 1-100 page(s): 15

External links
 Hervier, J. (1897). Descriptions d'espèces nouvelles de l'archipel de la Nouvelle-Calédonie. Journal de Conchyliologie. 45(1): 47-69

albotaeniatum
Gastropods described in 1897